Lao Jianfeng (born May 24, 1975) is a retired male Chinese long jumper. His personal best jump is 8.40 metres, achieved in May 1997 in Zhaoqing. This is the current Chinese record.

He finished tenth in the long jump at the 1997 World Championships and won the silver medal in triple jump at the 2002 Asian Games. He competed in both events at the 2000 Olympic Games.

Achievements

References

1975 births
Living people
Athletes (track and field) at the 2000 Summer Olympics
Chinese male long jumpers
Chinese male triple jumpers
Olympic athletes of China
Asian Games medalists in athletics (track and field)
Athletes (track and field) at the 2002 Asian Games
Asian Games silver medalists for China
Medalists at the 2002 Asian Games
21st-century Chinese people